Homeopathy is a peer-reviewed medical journal covering research, reviews, and debates on all aspects of homeopathy, a pseudoscientific  form of alternative medicine. It is the official journal of the London-based Faculty of Homeopathy. The journal was established in 1911 as the British Homoeopathic Journal, resulting from a merger between the British Homoeopathic Review and the Journal of the British Homoeopathic Society. It obtained its current name in 2001 and the Editor-in-chief is Dr Robert Mathie. The journal was originally published by Nature Publishing Group, and was then published by Elsevier. Elsevier's decision to publish this journal has been called into question, given homeopathy's proven ineffectiveness and unscientific status. Elsevier's Vice President of Global Corporate Relations, Thomas Reller, has defended Elsevier's decision to publish the journal, saying that "We support debate around this topic". The journal has been published by Thieme Medical Publishers since 2018.

Abstracting and indexing
The journal is abstracted and indexed in:
 CINAHL
 Current Contents/Clinical Medicine
 Embase/Excerpta Medica
 Index Medicus/MEDLINE/PubMed
 Science Citation Index Expanded
 Scopus
According to the Journal Citation Reports, the journal had a 2019 impact factor of 1.704. The journal's impact factor for 2015 was suppressed because of excessive self-citations.

References

External links
 

Alternative and traditional medicine journals
Quarterly journals
Literature about homeopathy
English-language journals
Publications established in 1911
Thieme academic journals